The 2010–11 Eastern Michigan Eagles men's basketball team represented Eastern Michigan University in the college basketball season of 2010–11.  The team was coached by 6th year head coach Charles E. Ramsey and played their homes game in Convocation Center. Ramsey was fired at the end of the season.

Before the season

Recruiting

Roster

Coaching staff

Schedule

|- style="background:#f9f9f9;"
| colspan=9 | *Non-Conference Game.  #Rankings from AP Poll.  All times are in Eastern Time Zone.
|}

Awards 
Second Team All-MAC
 Brandon Bowdry

References

Eastern Michigan Eagles men's basketball seasons
Eastern Michigan Eagles
Eastern Michigan Eagles men's basketball
Eastern Michigan Eagles men's basketball